Ice Festival, Ice and Snow Festival, or Snow and Ice Festival may refer to one of the following events.
Harbin International Ice and Snow Sculpture Festival, China
Sapporo Snow Festival, Japan
World Ice Art Championships, Alaska, United States
Perm International Snow and Ice Sculpture Festival, Russia
Snowking Winter Festival, Yellowknife, Canada
Michigan Technological University's Winter Carnival, Houghton, Michigan, United States
Meltdown Winter Ice Festival, Richmond, Indiana, United States
Saint Paul Winter Carnival, Saint Paul, Minnesota, United States

See also 
 Frost fair
 Winter carnival
 List of winter festivals

Winter events
ice and snow sculpture
ice and snow
Ice and snow sculpture
Snow sculpture